Kephyes is a genus of cnidarians belonging to the family Clausophyidae.

Species:

Kephyes hiulcus 
Kephyes ovata

References

Hydrozoan genera
Clausophyidae